"If I Could Give All My Love (Richard Manuel Is Dead)" is a song by the American rock band Counting Crows. It is the fourth track on their fourth album, Hard Candy (2002), inspired by the death of the Band member Richard Manuel. When released as a single, it reached number 40 in Ireland, number 50 in the United Kingdom, and became a minor chart hit in Australia and the Netherlands. In the United Kingdom, it debuted and peaked at number nine on the UK Rock Chart.

Background
The inspiration for the song, according to Adam Duritz, came from the sense of "not lasting" he felt when he went to bed and read a newspaper that stated Richard Manuel, a founding member of the Band, had died of an apparent suicide. Manuel was a pianist and vocalist, who suffered from bouts of depression—all abilities and traits shared by Duritz. Duritz stated that the sense of impermanence was "overwhelming" and 15 years after the death of Manuel this sense inspired him to write the song.

Track listings

UK CD1
 "If I Could Give All My Love" (album version) – 3:53
 "Big Yellow Taxi" (live) – 3:22
 "Ooh La La" – 4:34
 "If I Could Give All My Love" (video)

UK CD2
 "If I Could Give All My Love" (album version) – 3:53
 "A Long December" (live) – 3:54
 "Return of the Grievous Angel" – 4:21

European CD single
 "If I Could Give All My Love" – 3:53
 "Ooh La La" – 4:34

Australian CD single
 "If I Could Give All My Love"
 "Ooh La La"
 "Return of the Grievous Angel"
 "If I Could Give All My Love" (video)

Charts

Release history

References

2002 songs
2003 singles
The Band
Counting Crows songs
Cultural depictions of Canadian men
Cultural depictions of rock musicians
Song recordings produced by Steve Lillywhite
Songs written by Adam Duritz